The men's points race competition at the 2021 UEC European Track Championships was held on 6 October 2021.

Results

Qualifying
The top 10 riders in each heat qualified for the final.
Heat 1

Heat 2

Final
160 laps (40 km) were raced with 16 sprints.

References

Men's points race
European Track Championships – Men's points race